Városi Stadion (literally Town Stadium) was a multi-purpose stadium in Nyíregyháza, Hungary. It was used mostly for football matches and is the home stadium of Nyíregyháza Spartacus. The stadium was able to hold 10,500 people. In 2021, the stadium was demolished to construct a new stadium in its place with a capacity of 8,000.

References

External links
Városi Stadion Nyíregyháza at magyarfutball.hu

Football venues in Hungary
Nyíregyháza Spartacus FC
Multi-purpose stadiums in Hungary